The Joint Convention on the Safety of Spent Fuel Management and on the Safety of Radioactive Waste Management is a 1997 International Atomic Energy Agency (IAEA) treaty. It is the first treaty to address radioactive waste management on a global scale.

Content
The states that ratify the Convention agree to be governed by the Convention's provisions on the storage of nuclear waste, including transport and the location, design, and operation of storage facilities.

The Convention implements meetings of the state parties that review the states' implementation of the Convention. The Fourth Review Meeting was held in 2012. A summary report from the meeting, and links to the national reports from the participating countries, is available on the IAEA website.

Creation and state parties
The Convention was concluded in Vienna, Austria, on 29 September 1997 and entered into force on 18 June 2001. It was signed by 42 states. As of March 2016, it has 71 state parties plus the European Atomic Energy Community. Lebanon, and the Philippines have signed the Convention but have not ratified it.

The following are the parties to the Convention. States in bold have at least one nuclear power plant in operation.

References

1997 in Austria
2001 in the environment
International Atomic Energy Agency treaties
Radioactive waste
Treaties concluded in 1997
Treaties entered into force in 2001
Waste treaties
Treaties of Albania
Treaties of Argentina
Treaties of Armenia
Treaties of Australia
Treaties of Austria
Treaties of Belarus
Treaties of Belgium
Treaties of Bosnia and Herzegovina
Treaties of Botswana
Treaties of Brazil
Treaties of Bulgaria
Treaties of Canada
Treaties of Chile
Treaties of the People's Republic of China
Treaties of Croatia
Treaties of Cyprus
Treaties of the Czech Republic
Treaties of Denmark
Treaties of Estonia
Treaties of Finland
Treaties of France
Treaties of Gabon
Treaties of Georgia (country)
Treaties of Germany
Treaties of Ghana
Treaties of Greece
Treaties of Hungary
Treaties of Iceland
Treaties of Indonesia
Treaties of Ireland
Treaties of Italy
Treaties of Kazakhstan
Treaties of Japan
Treaties of South Korea
Treaties of Kyrgyzstan
Treaties of Latvia
Treaties of Lebanon
Treaties of Lithuania
Treaties of Luxembourg
Treaties of North Macedonia
Treaties of Malta
Treaties of Mauritania
Treaties of Mauritius
Treaties of Moldova
Treaties of Montenegro
Treaties of Morocco
Treaties of the Netherlands
Treaties of Nigeria
Treaties of Norway
Treaties of Oman
Treaties of Peru
Treaties of Poland
Treaties of Portugal
Treaties of Romania
Treaties of Russia
Treaties of Saudi Arabia
Treaties of Senegal
Treaties of Slovakia
Treaties of Slovenia
Treaties of South Africa
Treaties of Spain
Treaties of Sweden
Treaties of Switzerland
Treaties of Tajikistan
Treaties of Ukraine
Treaties of the United Arab Emirates
Treaties of the United Kingdom
Treaties of the United States
Treaties of Uruguay
Treaties of Uzbekistan
Treaties entered into by the European Atomic Energy Community
Treaties extended to Hong Kong
Treaties of Vietnam